Papaipema harrisii, known generally as the cow parsnip borer moth or heracleum stem borer, is a species of cutworm or dart moth in the family Noctuidae. It is found in North America.

The MONA or Hodges number for Papaipema harrisii is 9472.

References

Further reading

 
 
 

Papaipema